Kinga Surma (born ca. 1987/1988 in Poland) is a Canadian politician who is the Ontario Minister of Infrastructure since June 18, 2021. She represents the riding of Etobicoke Centre in the Legislative Assembly of Ontario as a member of the Progressive Conservative Party. She previously served as the Ontario's first Associate Minister of Transportation (Ontario) (GTA).  In the cabinet shuffle announced on June 18, 2021, she was promoted to the position of Minister of Infrastructure.

Early life
Surma was born in Poland and moved with her family to Canada when she was four years old, and was raised in Ottawa.

Surma attended the University of Guelph majoring in Public Policy & Administration, and spent a year in France studying Economics. After graduation, Surma relocated to Toronto.

Career

Surma worked for former Toronto City Councillor Peter Milczyn, and at the same time was the President for the Etobicoke-Lakeshore Progressive Conservative Party of Ontario (PC) riding association. Surma worked on the Etobicoke—Lakeshore 2013 by-election for PC candidate. Following the election she was fired from her job with at Toronto City Hall.

Surma ran for City Councillor in Ward 5 in the 2014 Toronto municipal election and placed second with 13.9% of the vote.

Surma won the contested PC nomination in the riding of Etobicoke Centre in November 2016. It was alleged that then former City Councillor Doug Ford intimidated her opponent in favour of Surma. Further controversies regarding the election followed, as Ford was accused of breaking party rules by purchasing party memberships to secure voters for the election of Surma. This came after the release of an audio recording of Ford recruiting members with Surma, claiming memberships are free despite voting being only open to party members who pay a membership fee. PC party chair Walied Soliman cleared Ford of wrongdoing in 2018.

Surma ran in the 2018 Ontario general election, and won her riding of Etobicoke Centre with 42.67% of the vote.

Surma presented her first successful motion in her first year in government in support of the Toronto Catholic School Board's International Languages Program (ILP).

On June 27, 2019, Surma was appointed as the Associate Minister of Transportation (GTA). She is the youngest female member of Executive Council of Ontario. The same year, she spoke in favour of expanding subways in the Greater Toronto Area. She also spoke in favour of expanding the provincial GO Transit rail network to provide two-way, all-day service on key segments of the network. In 2020, during COVID-19 pandemic, Surma introduced legislation to fast track construction on the province's new subway projects. On April 26, 2021 Surma introduced the Moving Ontarians More Safely Act regulating road safety, street racing, stunt driving.

Surma sought funding for a new Toronto Catholic District School Board school in her riding. On August 27, 2020 she announced provincial funding replace the Buttonwood hill school. On October 30, 2020 she announced a $26.4 million investment to build a new Catholic Secondary School in Etobicoke Centre and $35 of funding for the refurbishment of Bishop Allen Academy.

Election results

References

External links
 

1980s births
Living people
Canadian expatriates in France
Members of the Executive Council of Ontario
People from Etobicoke
Polish emigrants to Canada
Politicians from Ottawa
Politicians from Toronto
Progressive Conservative Party of Ontario MPPs
University of Guelph alumni
Women government ministers of Canada
Women MPPs in Ontario
21st-century Canadian women politicians